The Department of Science was an Australian government department that existed between December 1975 and December 1978. It was the second so-named Australian Government department.

Scope
Information about the department's functions and/or government funding allocation could be found in the Administrative Arrangements Orders, the annual Portfolio Budget Statements and in the department's annual reports.

According to the National Archives of Australia, at its creation, the department was responsible for:
Science and technology, including research, support of research and support of civil space programs
Meteorology
Ionospheric Prediction Service
Analytical laboratory service
Weights and measures

Structure
The department was an Australian Public Service department, staffed by officials who were responsible to the Minister for Science, James Webster.

The department was headed by a Secretary, initially Hugh Ennor (until October 1977) and then John Farrands.

Controversy
In December 1975, a task force of the Royal Commission on Australian Government accused the department of questionable logic, misinterpretation of facts and faulty data.

References

Science